The Order of the Liberator General San Martín is the highest decoration in Argentina. It is awarded to foreign politicians or military, deemed worthy of the highest recognition from Argentina. It is granted by the sitting President of Argentina.

History 

It owes its name to General José de San Martín, called Father of the Nation and Liberator. The original design was made by the Argentine engineer and sculptor Ángel Eusebio Ibarra García. It was created by Decree No. 5,000 of August 17, 1943; amended by Law No. 13. 202 of May 21, 1948; which in turn was repealed by Decree Law No. 16.628 of December 17, 1957, which recreates the Order. The modifications introduced were only in the form. The regulations still in force were approved by Decree No. 16,643 of December 18, 1967.

Grades 

The Grades are:
 Collar
 Grand Cross        
 Grand Officer       
 Commander        
 Officer                 
 Member

Notable Recipients

References

External links 
  History of San Martín
  Articles on San Martin on newspaper Clarín
  Sanmartinian National Institute
  Foreign Relations Ministry of Argentina

 
Liberator General San Martin, Order of the
José de San Martín
Liberator General San Martin, Order of the
1943 establishments in Argentina
Awards established in 1943